Events from the year 1976 in France.

Incumbents
 President: Valéry Giscard d'Estaing 
 Prime Minister: Jacques Chirac (until 29 August), Raymond Barre (starting 29 August)

Events
21 January – The first commercial Concorde flight takes off.
7 March – Cantonales Elections held.
14 March – Cantonales Elections held.
9 April – Peugeot takes over Citroen to form PSA Peugeot Citroen.
27 June – Palestinian extremists hijack an Air France plane in Greece with 246 passengers and 12 crew. They take it to Entebbe, Uganda.
June – Launch of the Renault 14, a five-door small family hatchback with front-wheel drive which is similar in concept to the hugely successful Volkswagen Golf from West Germany.
4 July – Entebbe Raid: Israeli airborne commandos free 103 hostages being held by Palestinian hijackers of an Air France plane at Uganda's Entebbe Airport; 1 Israeli and several Ugandan soldiers are killed in the raid.
25 August – Resignation of Jacques Chirac as Prime Minister of France; he is succeeded by Raymond Barre.

Arts and literature

Sport
24 June – Tour de France begins.
18 July – Tour de France ends, won by Lucien Van Impe of Belgium.

Births

January to March
2 January – Nicolas Goussé, soccer player.
17 January – Yohan Lachor, soccer player.
20 January – Lilian Jégou, cyclist.
20 January – Yann Pivois, cyclist.
22 January – Christophe Himmer, soccer player.
28 January – Pierrick Bourgeat, alpine skier.
31 January – Vincent Masingue, basketball player.
1 February – Julien Loy, triathlete.
2 February – Olivier Mutis, tennis player.
3 February – Stéphane Antiga, volleyball player.
7 February – Florent Brard, cyclist.
8 February – Nicolas Vouilloz, mountain biker and rally driver.
9 February – Walter Lapeyre, pistol shooter.
21 February – Richard Massolin, soccer player.
21 February – Armand Raimbault, soccer player.
22 February – Matthieu Louis-Jean, soccer player.
24 February – Romain Ferrier, soccer player.
25 February – Cyril Abidi, Kickboxing Champion and Muay Thai World Champion.
25 February – Sammy Traoré, soccer player.
26 February – Cédric Michaud, speed skater.
5 March – Stéphane Léoni, soccer player.
5 March – Samuel Plouhinec, cyclist.
6 March – Cédric Barbosa, soccer player.
6 March – Antoine Dénériaz, Alpine skier and Olympic gold medallist.
12 March – Julien Courbey, actor.
15 March – Sébastien Gondouin, soccer player.

April to June
3 April – Nicolas Escudé, tennis player.
4 April – Sébastien Enjolras, motor racing driver (died 1997).
8 April – Gaston Curbelo, soccer player.
8 April – Sylvain Marconnet, rugby union player.
15 April – Christophe Dussart, soccer player.
16 April – Doriane Vidal, snowboarder and Olympic medallist.
17 April – Maïwenn Le Besco, actress.
10 May – Romain Barnier, swimmer.
15 May – Cyrille Thouvenin, actor.
17 May – Benjamin Delmas, ice dancer.
22 May – Ludovic Valbon, rugby union player.
21 June – Alexandra Cousteau, environmentalist.
23 June – Patrick Vieira, international soccer player.
25 June – Sylvain N'Diaye, soccer player.

July to September
2 July – Laurent Lefèvre, cyclist.
9 July – Pascal Briand, speed skater.
10 July – Ludovic Giuly, soccer player.
16 July – Romain Haguenauer, ice dancer.
25 July – Stéphane Rideau, actor.
2 August – Stéphane Pichot, soccer player.
7 August – Nicolas Brusque, rugby union player.
8 August – Olivier Monterrubio, soccer player.
9 August – Audrey Tautou, actress.
20 August – Anaïs Croze, singer.
22 August – Laurent Hernu, decathlete.
25 August – Céline Lebrun, judoka and Olympic medallist.
26 August – Sébastien Vieilledent, rower and Olympic gold medallist.
27 August – Benoît Poilvet, cyclist.
31 August – Vincent Delerm, singer-songwriter, pianist and composer.
31 August – Romain Larrieu, soccer player.
4 September – Lise Legrand, wrestler and Olympic medallist.
6 September – Laurent Carrasco, rugby league player.
6 September – Alain Raguel, soccer player.
9 September – Emma de Caunes, actress.
14 September – Lionel Nallet, rugby union player.
19 September – Marc Boutruche, soccer player.
19 September – Laurent Emmanuelli, rugby union player.
20 September – Frédéric Jay, soccer player.
29 September – Grégory Tafforeau, soccer player.

October to December
5 October – Alessandra Sublet, television host
6 October – Hubert Henno, volleyball player.
15 October – Cédric Bardon, soccer player.
24 October – David Recorbet, soccer player.
26 October – Ludovic Asuar, soccer player.
1 November – Ludovic Mercier, rugby union player.
3 November – Arnaud Labbe, cyclist.
11 November – Nicolas Gillet, soccer player.
15 November – Julien Lachuer, soccer player.
25 November – Grégory Havret, golfer.
27 November – David Abrard, swimmer.
1 December – Yoann Bouchard, soccer player.
6 December – Cédric Claverie, judoka.
7 December – Benoît Tréluyer, motor racing driver.
18 December – Pierre Ducrocq, soccer player.
19 December – Jacques-Olivier Paviot, soccer player.
20 December – Benoît August, rugby union player.
25 December – Cédric Berthelin, soccer player.
31 December – Frédérique Bangué, athlete.

Deaths

January to June
8 January – Pierre Jean Jouve, poet and novelist (born 1887).
21 January – Joseph-Marie Martin, Cardinal (born 1891).
12 February – Charles Jourdan, fashion designer (born 1883).
20 February – René Cassin, jurist and judge, received the Nobel Peace Prize in 1968 (born 1887).
1 March – Jean Martinon, conductor and composer (born 1910).
3 March – Pierre Molinier, painter and photographer (born 1900).
8 March – Pauline de Rothschild, fashion icon and tastemaker (born 1908).
12 March – Jacques Carlu, architect and designer (born 1890).
19 March – Albert Dieudonné, actor, screenwriter, film director and novelist (born 1889).
1 April – Roger Rivière, cyclist (born 1936).
24 April – Ferdinand Le Drogo, cyclist (born 1903).
31 May – Jacques Monod, biologist, awarded Nobel Prize in Physiology or Medicine in 1965 (born 1910).
5 June – Jean de Limur, film director (born 1887).
27 June – Albert Dubout, cartoonist, illustrator, painter, and sculptor (born 1905).

July to December
27 July – Lucien Rosengart, engineer (born 1881).
13 August – Martial Guéroult, philosopher and historian of philosophy (born 1891).
27 August – Georges Marrane, politician (born 1888).
1 September – Jules Merviel, cyclist (born 1909).
24 September – Achille Souchard, cyclist (born 1900).
3 October – Émile Benveniste, structural linguist (born 1902).
 11 October — Werner Haas (pianist), German pianist (born 1931)
18 October – Janine Micheau, lyric soprano opera singer (born 1914).
21 October – Jean Berveiller, composer and organist (born 1904).
25 October – Raymond Queneau, poet and novelist (born 1903).
15 November – Jean Gabin, actor (born 1904).
23 November – André Malraux, author, adventurer and statesman (born 1901).
24 December – Jean de Broglie, politician, assassinated (born 1921).
28 December – Pierre La Mure, author (born 1899).

Full date unknown
Pierre Garat, civil servant in Vichy France (born 1919).
René Herse, bicycle constructor (born 1913).
Robert Louzon, engineer, revolutionary syndicalist, anarchist and socialist (born 1882).
François Ozenda, painter (born 1923).
Henriette Sauret, feminist, author, pacifist, journalist (born 1890).

See also
 List of French films of 1976

References

1970s in France